The Badia Fiesolana was a medieval and renaissance period Roman Catholic monastery located in the town of Fiesole (in the quarter of San Domenico), northeast of Florence, Italy. Since 1976 the building is the main seat of the European University Institute. The original Camaldolese monks building was completed in 1028 and was subsequently transferred to Benedictines from Montecassino and the Canons Regular of St. Augustine.

History 

The monastery was built between 1025-1028 on the location of a former chapel dedicated to Saint Peter and Saint Romulus. Originally, it bore the name of Saint Bartholomew. The present appearance dates from between 1456 and 1467.

Current use 

The former convent is now the seat of the European University Institute.

Images

References

Monasteries in Tuscany
1020s establishments in Europe
11th-century establishments in Italy
European University Institute buildings